Sahak III Bagratuni was an Armenian noble of the Bagratuni (Bagratid) family. He served as presiding prince of Armenia under Abbasid rule in 754–761. He was succeeded by Smbat VII Bagratuni.

8th-century kings of Armenia
Bagratuni dynasty
8th-century rulers in Asia
Vassal rulers of the Abbasid Caliphate
8th-century Armenian people
Princes of Armenia